The American Heritage Dictionary of the English Language (abbreviated AHD) uses a phonetic notation based on the Latin alphabet to transcribe the pronunciation of spoken English. It and similar respelling systems, such as those used by the Merriam-Webster and Random House dictionaries, are familiar to US schoolchildren.

The following tables show the AHD representations of English phonemes, along with the IPA equivalents as used on Wikipedia.

Vowels
In general, long vowels are marked with a macron, and short vowels with a breve. A circumflex may also be used to indicate a pre-rhotic vowel. Usage of other symbols vary.

Consonants

Suprasegmentals
Stress is indicated by a prime character following stressed syllables. The character is in boldface when it indicates primary stress.

See also 
 Pronunciation respelling for English
 International Phonetic Alphabet (IPA)

References

Phonetic alphabets
English dictionaries